Databricks is an American enterprise software company founded by the creators of Apache Spark. Databricks develops a web-based platform for working with Spark, that provides automated cluster management and IPython-style notebooks.

History 
Databricks grew out of the AMPLab project at University of California, Berkeley that was involved in making Apache Spark, an open-source distributed computing framework built atop Scala. The company was founded by Ali Ghodsi, Andy Konwinski, Arsalan Tavakoli-Shiraji, Ion Stoica, Matei Zaharia, Patrick Wendell, and Reynold Xin.

In November 2017, the company was announced as a first-party service on Microsoft Azure via the integration Azure Databricks.

The company develops Delta Lake, an open-source project to bring reliability to data lakes for machine learning and other data science use cases.

In June 2020, Databricks acquired Redash, an open-source tool designed to help data scientists and analysts visualize and build interactive dashboards of their data.

In February 2021 together with Google Cloud, Databricks provided integration with the Google Kubernetes Engine and Google's BigQuery platform.
Fortune ranked Databricks as one of the best large "Workplaces for Millennials" in 2021.
At the time, the company said more than 5,000 organizations used its products.

In August 2021, Databricks finished their eighth round of funding by raising $1.6 billion and valuing the company at $38 billion.

In October 2021, Databricks made its second acquisition of German no-code company 8080 Labs. 8080 Labs makes bamboolib, a data exploration tool that does not require coding to use.

Funding 
In September 2013, Databricks announced it raised $13.9 million from Andreessen Horowitz and said it aimed to offer an alternative to Google's MapReduce system. Microsoft was a noted investor of Databricks in 2019, participating in the company's Series E at an unspecified amount. The company has raised $1.9 billion in funding, including a $1 billion Series G led by Franklin Templeton at a $28 billion post-money valuation in February 2021. Other investors include Amazon Web Services, CapitalG (a growth equity firm under Alphabet, Inc.) and Salesforce Ventures.

Products 
Databricks develops and sells a cloud data platform using the marketing term "lakehouse", a portmanteau based on the terms "data warehouse" and "data lake". Databricks' lakehouse is based on the open source Apache Spark framework that allows analytical queries against semi-structured data without a traditional database schema. In October 2022, Lakehouse received FedRAMP authorized status for use with the U.S. federal government and contractors.

Databricks' Delta Engine launched in June 2020 as a new query engine that layers on top of Delta Lake to boost query performance. It is compatible with Apache Spark and MLflow, which are also open source projects from Databricks. 

In November 2020, Databricks introduced Databricks SQL (previously known as SQL Analytics) for running business intelligence and analytics reporting on top of data lakes. Analysts can query data sets directly with standard SQL or use product connectors to integrate directly with business intelligence tools like Tableau, Qlik, SigmaComputing, Looker, and ThoughtSpot.

Databricks offers a platform for other workloads, including machine learning, data storage and processing, streaming analytics, and business intelligence.

The company has also created Delta Lake, MLflow and Koalas, open source projects that span data engineering, data science and machine learning. In addition to building the Databricks platform, the company has co-organized massive open online courses about Spark and a conference for the Spark community called the Data + AI Summit, formerly known as Spark Summit.

Operations 
Databricks is headquartered in San Francisco. It also has operations in Canada, the United Kingdom, Netherlands, Singapore, Australia, Germany, France, Japan, China, South Korea, India, and Brazil.

References

Big data companies
Companies based in San Francisco
Privately held companies based in California
Software companies based in the San Francisco Bay Area
Software companies established in 2013
Software companies of the United States